Andranik Eskandarian (Armenian: , , born 31 December 1951) is an Iranian former footballer. He played as a defender for the F.C. Ararat Tehran, Taj SC and New York Cosmos of the North American Soccer League.

He won the Iranian league in 1975 and reached the second place in 1974. Further he won the Hazfi Cup in 1977. He played six years for Taj SC. Taj's fans called him Barbed Wire.

Eskandarian was a member of the Iranian team winning the Asia Cup 1976 in Tehran and reaching the quarterfinals of the Olympic Tournament in Montreal in 1976. He also
played for Iran in the 1978 World Cup, the country's first appearance in the tournament. He infamously was the first member of Iran's team to score in the World Cup: an own-goal in a match against Scotland that his teammate later tied, 1-1. The game was still considered a success for Iran, including Eskandarian's play as a defender against Kenny Dalglish and Joe Jordan, and an embarrassment for Scotland.

Soon after that, he moved to America to play for the highest-profile team in the country, the New York Cosmos, beginning in the 1979 season. After the Cosmos folded in 1984, Eskandarian played for the New York Express during its half-season in the Major Indoor Soccer League. From 1989 through 1990, he played for the New Jersey Eagles of the American Soccer League.

Personal
Andranik Eskandarian was born on 31 December 1951 in Tehran in an Armenian family. He is the father of former Major League Soccer player Alecko Eskandarian. Eskandarian became a United States citizen in 1984 and now owns and operates two sporting goods stores in New Jersey.

Honours

Club
Taj
Iranian Football League: 1974–75
Hazfi Cup: 1976–77

New York Cosmos
North American Soccer League: 1978, 1980, 1982

National
Iran
AFC Asian Cup: 1976

References

External links
NASL career stats

1951 births
Living people
American Professional Soccer League players
American soccer players
American Soccer League (1988–89) players
Association football defenders
Esteghlal F.C. players
Ethnic Armenian sportspeople
Expatriate soccer players in the United States
Iran international footballers
Iranian expatriate footballers
Iranian footballers
Iranian emigrants to the United States
Major Indoor Soccer League (1978–1992) players
North American Soccer League (1968–1984) indoor players
New Jersey Eagles players
New York Cosmos players
New York Cosmos (MISL) players
New York Express players
North American Soccer League (1968–1984) players
Sportspeople from Tehran
Iranian people of Armenian descent
American people of Armenian descent
Olympic footballers of Iran
1976 AFC Asian Cup players
Footballers at the 1976 Summer Olympics
1978 FIFA World Cup players
AFC Asian Cup-winning players
F.C. Ararat Tehran players